The Miami-Dade Corrections & Rehabilitation Department (MDCR) is a County Department serving all of Miami-Dade County's 30 municipal police departments, the county police department (MDPD), as well as state agencies.  The MDCR is the 7th largest county jail system in the United States, with approximately 2,906 employees. [FY 2009–10]  The Department is still often referred by its former name, DCJ for Dade County Jail.  Miami-Dade Corrections Officers are easily identified by their white shirts with green trousers with gray stripe.  Miami-Dade Corrections vehicles are identified by their green and white livery.  MDCR officers carry silver badges, while officers with the ranks of sergeant and above carry gold badges.  The badge is exactly the same as the Miami-Dade County Police Department to reflect the fact that they were at one time one entity.
The MDCR operates  six detention  facilities with a system-wide average of approximately 7,000 inmates, and books approximately 114,000 inmates annually (312 per day).  Several facilities are nationally accredited by the American Correctional Association, as well as at the state level by the Florida Corrections Accreditation Commission.  The current director of the department is Daniel Junior, who was appointed by Miami-Dade Mayor Carlos Giménez.  The Department's headquarters is  located at 2525 NW 62nd Street, Miami, Florida.

History

When the Dade County Sheriff's Office was created in 1836 to serve the newly created County of Dade, the jail function was a part of that office. There was one county, that later was sub-divided into four counties, Miami-Dade, Broward, Palm Beach, and Martin.

In 1928, a high-rise jail was completed above the courthouse on West Flagler Street. In 1930, the Dade County Stockade was built at S.W. 87th Avenue & 61st Street, This building later served as the Fire Department Headquarters for many years, and remains in use by the County Fire Department.

By 1950, the Dade County area had been reduced to its present size of approximately 2,139 square miles.

In 1954, the City of Miami completed a jail lock-up called the Stockade at 7199 N.W. 41st Street. In 1956 the City of Miami occupied a new headquarters and jail and they leased the Stockade to the Public Safety Department.

In 1957, a metropolitan form of government was established, and the Dade County Sheriffs' Office was subsequently renamed the Public Safety Department.  The Public Safety Department's organizational structure, as determined by the Metropolitan Charter, included responsibility for police, including  the main jail and stockade, fire protection, civil defense, animal control, and motor vehicle inspection. In 1960 a unified jail plan is proposed by Dade County.  In 1960 the first Chief of Dade County Jail is appointed Captain Noah Scott will command 4 lieutenants, 9 Sergeants, and 98 officers. In 1961 there are 22 jails in the county.  On March 25, 1961, a criminal justice complex opens with a 10-story jail situated between and attached to, the Public Safety Department Headquarters, and the Court House.  The top four floors interiors are an empty shell, awaiting future growth.  In November 1966 Jack O. Sandstrom is appointed Chief of the Jail Division.

On January 1, 1968, the City of Miami Stockade is now leased to the county for a period of 30 years.

On January 28, 1970, the Corrections & Rehabilitation Department was established by action of the Dade County Commission.  Section 8.01(D) and Section 4.02 of the Metropolitan Dade County Charter,  and Administrative Order 9–22.  All duties and functions of the Sheriff's Office which pertain to the booking, incarceration, transportation between County Jail facilities, custody, and release of prisoners who are brought to County jail facilities, are transferred from the Jail and Corrections Division of the Public Safety Department and are delegated to the Director of the Corrections and Rehabilitation Department. Jack O. Sandstrom is appointed as Department Director.   The department consisted of two facilities at that time... The Pretrial Detention Center, and the Stockade. Female prisoners were housed on the second floor of the PTDC at that time.  In 1972 the City of Miami opens a new police headquarters, and the second floor jail located at 1145 N.W. 11th Street is transferred "leased" to the Corrections Department, on May 22, 1972, and is used as a facility to house women.  It is called the Women's Annex.

On January 1, 1973, the Justice of the Peace Courts, Criminal Court of Record, Circuit Court, Metropolitan Court are all merged into the County Court or Circuit Court.

In 1974 the North Dade Detention Center is opened.  The master plan was to begin the planning and construction of jails in local communities to service the local population.  This facility is the only one built under this concept. In 1976 the North Dade Detention Center is closed and leased to the State of Florida.

In January 1977 All Municipal Courts are abolished, turning over responsibility to the Dade County Criminal Justice System.

In 1978 a new four-story Women's Detention Center is opened at 1401 N.W. 7th Avenue.  Pamala Jo Davis is the Facility Director.  All women are transferred from the Women's Annex.  In 1978 The empty shell on floors 7–10, except for C-wing are completed at the PTDC.  In 1981 the old Women's Annex was renovated and leased again from the City of Miami for use as a misdemeanor booking facility. It was named the Interim Central Detention Center (ICDC).  In 1987 a temporary facility constructed entirely of modular trailers was opened with 400 beds.  It was named the Metro West Detention Center. In 1988 two more temporary fiber cement structures were built on the parking lot of Metro West Detention Center.  In 1989 a 9-story high rise was built with 1,000 cells, and was named the Turner, Guilford, Knight Correctional Center.  The facility name was in honor of three outstanding local people.

In 1991 all original structures at Metro West Detention Center were torn down when a new 1,002-bed facility was opened on the Northern half of the property. Construction then continued and a 1,230-bed addition was completed over the old facility site, and was completed in 1994.  In 1995 the existing Ward-D with 6 beds was closed and a new location in the Rehabilitation Hospital building with 30 beds was constructed in the Jackson Memorial Hospital Complex.

In 1996 $14 million was expended on water & sewer pipe lines and connections to a future site for new facilities. The location of this site is one mile (1.6 km) West of Krome Avenue, with an entrance on Tamiami Trail. The first  of the entrance road is shared with the State of Florida, Department of Corrections facility, the Everglades Correctional Institution.

Organization

MDCR provides detention services in the following locations.

  Pre-Trial Detention Center (PTDC), formerly known as DCJ or Main Jail
  Training & Treatment Center (T&TC), formerly known as the Stockade
  Turner Guilford Knight Correctional Center (TGKCC)
  Metro West Detention Center (MWDC)
  Boot Camp
  Ward-D, located in the Rehabilitation building of Miami-Dade County's Jackson Memorial Hospital
  North Dade Community Correctional Center formerly known as North Dade Detention Center (temporarily closed)

Command structure

  Director
  Deputy Director Support Service, Deputy Director Custody Services
  Assistant Director Management Services
  Chief Administrative Services Division
  Chief Construction Management Division
  Chief County Services Division
  Chief Fiscal Resources Division
  Chief Professional Compliance Division
  Chief Program Services Division
  Special Services Division
  Transitional Housing Division

Specialized units

  Public Affairs Unit
  Food Service Bureau & Administration
  Internal Affairs
  Training Bureau, located at Miami-Dade Police Departments Training facility.
  Pretrial Release Bureau
  Court Services Division
  K-9 Unit
  Policy and Planning Bureau (PPB)
  Policy Development Unit (PDU)
  Research, Evaluation, and Data Management (RED)
  Inmate Transportation Bureau
  Intake and Release Bureau
  Material Management Bureau
  Information Systems Bureau
  Chaplaincy Services Unit
  Reentry Unit
  Facilities Management Bureau
  Jail Commissary
  Monitored Release
  Medical Services
  Budget & Finance Bureau
  Personnel Bureau

Operations

The current [FY2009-20] operating budget of the department is $307,938,000.
Inmates that are not bonded out or released in one day are charged daily for their care.  This is called a substance fee and it ranges from $2 – $5 per day, and also includes a one-time $10.00 charge for a uniform that is issued in the classification process.  Inmates are also charged $3 for visits to jail medical clinics to see a Nurse and $5 to see a doctor.  Although fees are assessed for every inmate, those that have no money, classified as indigent, pay no fees. Family members may put cash in an inmate's account, from which the inmate pays the substance fees, but may also buy approx. 200 different items from the commissary, The average length of stay is 22 days. The Department  served an average of 8,165 meals per day at an average cost of $1.27 per  meal. [FY-2008-09]

References

  Florida Accreditation: Metro West Detention Center & Women's Detention Center Accreditation
  ACA: Women's Detention Center Accreditation
  ACA: Central Office Accreditation
  ACA: Boot Camp Accreditation 
  Final Report of the Grand Jury, May 1989
  Final Report of The Grand Jury, Fall 1970
  Final Report of the Grand Jury, Fall, 1960
  Final Report of the Grand Jury, Fall 1958
  Final Report of the Grand Jury, Fall 1954
  Dade County Courthouse History

External links
 Miami-Dade Corrections
 Miami-Dade County Crime Statistics, May, 2010
 Miami-Dade County Boot Camp

See also
  Innocents in Jail: INS moves refugee Women from Krome to TGKCC, Miami, June 2001
  Jail Diversion for Mentally Ill Top Priority in Miami-Dade, May, 2003

Government of Miami-Dade County, Florida